Andrei Gerachtchenko (born April 29, 1970) is a Belarusian sport shooter. At age thirty-eight, Gerachtchenko made his official debut for the 2008 Summer Olympics in Beijing, where he competed in the men's skeet shooting. He finished only in thirty-fourth place by four points behind Greece's Georgios Salavantakis from the final attempt, for a total score of 109 targets.

References

External links
NBC Olympics Profile

Belarusian male sport shooters
Skeet shooters
Living people
Olympic shooters of Belarus
Shooters at the 2008 Summer Olympics
Sportspeople from Minsk
1970 births
European Games competitors for Belarus
Shooters at the 2019 European Games